Dave Kern (born March 23, 1981 in Glenolden, Pennsylvania) is an  American soccer player who last played for the Real Maryland Monarchs of the USL Second Division, and for Baltimore Blast in the Major Indoor Soccer League.

Career

College
Kern attended Cardinal O'Hara High School and played college soccer at Misericordia University in Dallas, Pennsylvania, where he posted at 0.75 goals against average en route to the school's first-ever NCAA Tournament appearance in 2000. He was named his team's MVP in 2001 and 2002, earned First-Team All-Middle Atlantic Region selections in 2000 and 2002, Second-Team All-Middle Atlantic Region in 2001 and was a three-time All-PA Conference selection.

Professional
Kern began his career in 2004 when he signed with the Harrisburg City Islanders in the USL Second Division, and subsequently became the team's starting goalkeeper in all four years at the team, winning the USL2 championship in 2007.

In September 2007 Kern left Harrisburg to join the Baltimore Blast of the Major Indoor Soccer League as their backup goalkeeper, helping the team win an American Indoor Championship in his debut season.

Kern signed for the Real Maryland Monarchs in 2009.

External links
Real Maryland Monarchs bio
Baltimore Blast bio

1981 births
Living people
People from Glenolden, Pennsylvania
American soccer players
Baltimore Blast (2008–2014 MISL) players
Association football goalkeepers
Penn FC players
Major Indoor Soccer League (2001–2008) players
Misericordia University alumni
Real Maryland F.C. players
Soccer players from Pennsylvania
USL Second Division players
Misericordia Cougars
College men's soccer players in the United States